Ctenoderus is a genus of beetles in the family Buprestidae, containing the following species:

 Ctenoderus chloris (Germain, 1856)
 Ctenoderus maulicus (Molina, 1782)
 Ctenoderus oyarcei (Germain & Kerremans, 1906)

References

Buprestidae genera